The Tale of How  is a 2006 South African animated film.

Synopsis 
A giant octopus with a tree growing in his head devours the dodos that live there.

Awards 
 Woodstock Film Festival 2006 - Honorary Mention
 Byron Bay International Film Festival 2008 - Best Animation

References

External links
 
 
 

2006 films
2006 animated films
South African animated films
Dodo
South African short films